Francis Gordon "Skim" Brown (September 9, 1879 – May 10, 1911) was an American college football player. He played for the Yale Bulldogs football team of Yale University from 1897 to 1900. In 1900, he captained the Yale football team which was referred to as the "Team of the Century". He was also an academic leader of the Phi Beta Kappa Society.

Biography
Brown was born in New York City, September 6, 1879, to Francis Gordon Brown, Sr. and Julia Noyes Tracy.

After his college career, he entered the banking business, before he died from diabetes at age 31. He was elected to the College Football Hall of Fame in 1954. He is the namesake of the Gordon Brown Memorial Prize.

References

External links
 
 

1879 births
1911 deaths
19th-century players of American football
American football guards
Yale Bulldogs football players
All-American college football players
College Football Hall of Fame inductees
Players of American football from New York City
Deaths from diabetes